The following is a comprehensive discography of French electronic music duo Justice. Their discography comprises three studio albums, three live albums, and twenty-one singles, among others.

Albums

Studio albums

Other albums

Extended plays

Singles

Promotional singles

Music videos

Remixes

Mixes

Songwriting and production credits

References

External links
 
 

Discography
Discographies of French artists
Electronic music discographies